Palace Theatre, Albany 1977 is a live album by Bruce Springsteen and the E Street Band, released in August 2017. It is the fifteenth such release by the Bruce Springsteen Archives. The show was recorded on February 7, 1977 at the Palace Theatre in Albany, NY and is the first-ever soundboard recording to surface from the 1977 tour which features early renditions of “Something In The Night,” “Rendezvous” and “The Promise” along with the unreleased original “Action In The Streets” featuring the Miami Horns. 

The concert is available on CD and digital download at live.brucespringsteen.net. and as a bundle titled Action in the Streets which also includes Auditorium Theatre, Rochester, NY 1977.

Track listing
All songs by Bruce Springsteen, except where noted.

Main set

"Something in the Night" – 6:06
"Spirit in the Night" – 6:59
"Rendezvous" – 3:31
"It's My Life" – 13:21
originally written by Brill Building, Roger Atkins and Carl D'Errico, and recorded by The Animals
"Thunder Road" – 6:39
"Mona" – 4:27
originally written by Ellas McDaniel, and recorded by Bo Diddley
"She's the One" – 6:15
"The Promise" – 6:12
"Backstreets" – 12:26
"Growin' Up" – 9:43
"Tenth Avenue Freeze-Out" – 4:52
"Jungleland" – 10:48
"Rosalita (Come Out Tonight)" – 10:19
"4th of July, Asbury Park (Sandy)" – 7:29
"Action in the Streets" – 4:14
"Born to Run" – 3:53

Personnel
The E Street Band
Bruce Springsteen – lead vocals, electric guitar, harmonica, piano
Roy Bittan – piano, backing vocals
Clarence Clemons – tenor saxophone, baritone saxophones, percussion, background vocals
Garry Tallent – bass guitar
Steven Van Zandt – electric guitar, background vocals
Danny Federici – organ, glockenspiel, accordion
Max Weinberg – drums

Miami Horns
Ed De Palma – saxophone
John Binkley – trumpet
Steve Paraczky – trumpet, flugelhorn
Dennis Orlock – trombone

References

2017 live albums
Bruce Springsteen Archives